A convulsant is a drug which induces convulsions and/or epileptic seizures, the opposite of an anticonvulsant. These drugs generally act as stimulants at low doses, but are not used for this purpose due to the risk of convulsions and consequent excitotoxicity. Most convulsants are antagonists (or inverse agonists) at either the GABAA or glycine receptors, or ionotropic glutamate receptor agonists. Many other drugs may cause convulsions as a side effect at high doses (e.g. bupropion, tramadol, pethidine, dextropropoxyphene, clomipramine) but only drugs whose primary action is to cause convulsions are known as convulsants. Nerve agents such as sarin, which were developed as chemical weapons, produce convulsions as a major part of their toxidrome, but also produce a number of other effects in the body and are usually classified separately. Dieldrin which was developed as an insecticide blocks chloride influx into the neurons causing hyperexcitability of the CNS and convulsions. The Irwin observation test and other studies that record clinical signs are used to test the potential for a drug to induce convulsions. Camphor, and other terpenes given to children with colds can act as convulsants (sympathomimetics, piperazine derivatives, theophylline, antihistamines, etc.) in children who have had febrile seizures.



Uses
Some convulsants such as pentetrazol and flurothyl were previously used in shock therapy in psychiatric medicine, as an alternative to electroconvulsive therapy. Others such as strychnine and tetramethylenedisulfotetramine are used as poisons for exterminating pests. Bemegride and flumazenil are used to treat drug overdoses (of barbiturates and benzodiazepines respectively), but may cause convulsions if the dose is too high. Convulsants are also widely used in scientific research, for instance in the testing of new anticonvulsant drugs.  Convulsions are induced in captive animals, then high doses of anticonvulsant drugs are administered. For example, kainic acid can lead to status epilepticus in animals as it is a cyclic analog of l-glutamate and an agonist for kainate receptors in the brain which makes it a potent neurotoxin and excitant.

Examples

GABAA receptor antagonists, inverse agonists or negative allosteric modulators 
GABAA receptor antagonists are drugs that bind to GABAA receptors but do not activate them and inhibit the action of GABA. Thus it blocks both the endogenous and exogenous actions of GABAA  receptor agonists.
 Bemegride
 Bicuculline
 Cicutoxin
 Cyclothiazide
 DMCM
 FG-7142
 Fipronil
 Flumazenil
 Flurothyl
 Gabazine
 IPTBO
 Laudanosine
 Oenanthotoxin
 Pentylenetetrazol(Metrazol)
 Phenylsilatrane
 Picrotoxin
 Sarmazenil
 Securinine
 Sinomenine
 TBPO
 TBPS
 Tetramethylenedisulfotetramine
 Thujone

GABA synthesis inhibitors 
GABA synthesis inhibitors are drugs that inhibit the action of GABA.
 3-Mercaptopropionic acid
 Allylglycine

Glycine receptor antagonists 
Glycine receptor antagonists are drugs which inactivates the glycine receptors.
 Bicuculline
 Brucine
 Colubrine
 Diaboline
 Gelsemine
 Hyenandrine
 Laudanosine
 Oripavine
 RU-5135 (also GABA antagonist)
 Sinomenine
 Strychnine
 Thebaine
 Tutin

Ionotropic glutamate receptor agonists 
Ionotropic glutamate receptor agonists are drugs that activate the ionotropic glutamate receptors in the brain.
 AMPA
 Domoic acid
 Kainic acid
 NMDA
 Quinolinic acid
 Quisqualic acid
 Tetrazolylglycine

Acetylcholine receptor agonists 
Acetylcholine receptor agonists are drugs that activate the acetylcholine receptors.
 Anatoxin-a
 Pilocarpine

Advantages 
Camphor injections for psychiatric treatment were inefficient and were replaced by pentylenetetrazol. Seizures induced by chemicals like flurothyl were clinically effective as electric convulsions with lesser side effects on memory retention. Therefore, considering flurothyl induced seizures in modern anesthesia facilities is encouraged to relieve medication treatment resistant patients with psychiatric illnesses like mood disorders and catatonia.

Risks/Complications 
Convulsants like pentylenetetrazol and flurothyl were effective in psychiatric treatment but difficult to administer. Flurothyl was not widely being used due to the persistence of the ethereal aroma and fears in the professional staff that they might seize.

History 
In 1934, camphor-induced and pentylenetetrazol-induced brain seizures were first used to relieve psychiatric illnesses. But camphor was found ineffective. In 1957, inhalant anesthetic flurothyl was tested and found to be clinically effective in the induction of seizures, even though certain risks persisted.

References